The Big Snake of the World is a Canadian drama film, directed by Yves Dion and released in 1999. The film stars Murray Head as Tom Paradise, a night shift Société de transport de Montréal bus driver interacting with various people both on and off the job.

Supporting characters include Monsieur (Gabriel Arcand), a lonely man who suffers from schizophrenia; the Dog Lady (France Labonté), a woman who carries her dog with her everywhere she goes; the Teenager (Tobie Pelletier), a young man who rides the bus every night to get off at the Notre Dame des Neiges Cemetery; Anaïs (Zoe Latraverse), a young woman with a secret who tries to seduce Tom; and Carmen (Louise Portal), a former lover of Tom's with whom he is reunited.

The film received two Genie Award nominations at the 20th Genie Awards in 2000, for Best Supporting Actor (Arcand) and Best Original Screenplay (Monique Proulx). At the 2nd Jutra Awards, the film received nominations for Best Supporting Actor (Jean Pierre Bergeron), Best Supporting Actress (Portal) and Best Original Music (Gaëtan Gravel and Serge LaForest).

References

External links 
 

1999 films
Canadian drama films
Quebec films
National Film Board of Canada films
1999 drama films
French-language Canadian films
1990s Canadian films